In the car industry, underglow or ground effects lighting refers to neon or LED aftermarket car customization in which lights are attached to the underside of the chassis so that they illuminate the ground underneath the car. Underglow has become popular in car shows to add aesthetic appeal to the cars. Some US states prohibit underglow on public roads, while other countries restrict their use.

Andrew Wilson, who holds 14 patents on ground effects lighting and other products, invented it in 1987. He changed his name from "Andrew" to "They" in 2004.

Types of underglow

Neon
Neon tubes are used for the underglow. Though neon gas only produces the color red, adding other elemental gases can produce up to 150 colors. Because neon tubes are gas compressed, they tend to break often while going over speed bumps. With the neon tubes, people are more able to adjust them to follow specific rhythms like music.

LED
LEDs are light-emitting diodes which can be arranged in clusters. LEDs generally last longer than neon tubes, while LED strips are also considerably less fragile. They have multi-color capabilities and can have strobe effects.

There are 3 major styles of underglow LED lights: pod style led lights, LED strips and flexible LED tubes. LED pods consist of a rigid housing containing several LED lights as well as a lens. LED strips are easy to install almost everywhere, including engine bays or air intake scoops. LED tubes produce steady light that resembles classic neon glow.

Recent LED developments have led to underglow that can respond to music, draw patterns and act as courtesy lights or brake lights. Sometimes this is done via Bluetooth and a smart phone or an RF remote.

Legality

United States 
In the United States of America, certain underglow lights are illegal however this is largely based on individual states and varies state to state. Particularly the colors blue and red, as well as any kind of flashing light effects, are banned from public streets in some states as they can distract drivers or be confused with police cars. Almost all the states prohibit the colors green, red and blue because these are used for emergency purposes only. However, the laws governing the underglow of a car depend on the state. States where there is a lot of traffic and have a lot of cities have stricter regulations due to the high risk of crashes.

Ground effects lighting is illegal in the state of Michigan, Massachusetts and Maine. In California, underglow lights are allowed to be used in places other than public roads and there could be a penalty if found using them in public roads. Underglow is legal in Ohio. In Vermont, there is a penalty if underglow is turned on while driving. In Alaska, underglow lights are allowed as long as the color is white, yellow, or amber. In Florida, underglow use is not illegal, although several restrictions apply.

Canada 
Underglow or ground effects lightings are illegal in the province of Alberta, Canada. The use of these lightings are prohibited under section 4 subsection (4) of Alberta's Vehicle Equipment Regulation.

In British Columbia, Canada. Underglow is considered to be "off road" lights and must be covered with an opaque cover anytime the vehicle is on a highway, parked or being driven on public roads.

Europe 
Underglow is allowed in the UK, but color and positioning restrictions apply.

References

Automotive accessories